Davydovskaya is a rural locality (a village) in Noginskoye Rural Settlement, Syamzhensky District, Vologda Oblast, Russia. The population was 107 as of 2002.

Geography 
Davydovskaya is located 3 km southeast of Syamzha (the district's administrative centre) by road. Syamzha is the nearest rural locality.

References 

Rural localities in Syamzhensky District